The Supreme Soviet of the Ukrainian SSR (Ukrainian: Верховна Рада Української РСР, tr. Verkhovna Rada Ukrains'koi RSR; Russian: Верховный Совет Украинской ССР, tr. Verkhovnyy Sovet Ukrainskoy SSR) was the supreme soviet (main legislative institution) of the Ukrainian SSR, one of the union republics of the Soviet Union. The Supreme Soviet of the Ukrainian SSR was established in 1937 replacing the All-Ukrainian Congress of Soviets.

Prior to demokratizatsiya, the Supreme Soviet had characterized as a rubber stamp for the Soviet Ukrainian regime or as only being able to affect issues of low sensitivity and salience to the regime by the Ukrainian Communist Party, similar to all other supreme soviets in the union republics. The 1990 election in Ukraine was the first in the UkSSR where opposition parties were permitted to run.

History 
The first elections for the Supreme Soviet of the Ukrainian SSR were held from July 25th to July 28th in 1938. A total of 304 deputies were elected and Mykhailo Burmystenko was elected Chairman of the Supreme Soviet of the Ukrainian SSR.

Chairmen of the Supreme Soviet 
After Burmystenko's death in 1941, the position of Chairman of the Supreme Soviet of the Ukrainian SSR was vacant until 1947. The longest-serving Chairman of the Supreme Soviet of the Ukrainian SSR is Oleksandr Korniychuk.

List of Chairmen of the Supreme Soviet:

See also 
 Declaration of Independence of Ukraine
 Verkhovna Rada
 Supreme Soviet

References 

 

Historical legislatures
1937 establishments in Ukraine
1991 disestablishments in Ukraine
Government of the Ukrainian Soviet Socialist Republic
Defunct unicameral legislatures
Ukrainian